Presidential elections were held in Azerbaijan on 7 June 1992, the first in more than seventy years not held under communist control. Five candidates were on the ballot, seeking election to a five-year term. The election featured the unprecedented use of television, posters, and other media by multiple candidates to communicate platforms and solicit votes.

The candidates included APF leader Abulfaz Elchibey, former parliament speaker Yaqub Mamedov, Movement for Democratic Reforms leader and Minister of Justice Ilyas Ismayilov, National Democratic Group leader Rafig Abdullayev, and Union of Democratic Intelligentsia candidate Nizami Suleymanov. Two other candidates, from the NIP and the APF, withdrew from the race during the campaign. To register, each candidate had to collect at least 20,000 signatures and present them to the Central Electoral Commission. Aliyev was unable to run because of a constitutional provision barring candidates over sixty-five years of age. The government agreed to allow international observers to monitor the election. Etibar Mammadov, Elchibey's main rival in the polls, dropped out of the race a few days before the election, calling for rule by a coalition government and the postponement of balloting until Azerbaijan's state of war with Armenia ended.

Elchibey's election as president signaled a break in communist party dominance of Azerbaijani politics. He received 60.9% of more than three million votes cast. The runner-up, Suleimanov, made a surprise showing of 34% of the vote by promising Azerbaijanis instant wealth and victory in Nagorno-Karabakh. No other candidate garnered as much as five per cent of the vote.

Elchibey had been a student of Arabic philology, a translator, and a college instructor. In 1975 the KGB imprisoned him for two years for anti-Soviet activities. In a postelection address to the nation, he announced a stabilization phase based on the transfer of power to his democratic faction. When that phase ended in 1993, constitutional, economic, and cultural reforms would be implemented, according to this plan. His top domestic policy priorities, creation of a national army and a national currency backed by gold reserves, were seen as necessary elements for national sovereignty. Despite the new president's intentions, the war in Nagorno-Karabakh dominated politics, and Elchibey and his party steadily lost influence and popular appeal because of continual military losses, a worsening economy, political stalemate, and government corruption.

Results

References

Presidential elections in Azerbaijan
1992 in Azerbaijan
Azerbaijan
Azerbaijan
Election and referendum articles with incomplete results